Chiry-Ourscamp is a French commune in the Oise department, region of Hauts-de-France.

History
An early reference to the community dates to the seventh century, when it was referred to as Ursi campus. Château Mennechet, a castle constructed in the late 19th century in Chiry-Ourscamp lies in ruins after being left vacant following the Second World War.

See also
Communes of the Oise department

References

Communes of Oise